Alt dette og Island med is a 1951 Danish drama film directed by Johan Jacobsen and starring Sonja Wigert.

Cast
 Sonja Wigert as Nina Lind, singer
 Karl Gustav Ahlefeldt as Saboteur
 Asbjørn Andersen as German officer
 Bjarne Bø as Ship captain
 Jack Fjeldstad as A man
 Kjeld Jacobsen as Leif Høst
 Henki Kolstad as Bjørn, Finn's assistant
 Sture Lagerwall as Gustaf Dalander, Nina's husband
 Louis Miehe-Renard as Engineer
 Tavs Neiiendam as Saboteur
 Arne Thomas Olsen as Ringer
 Kjeld Petersen as Saboteur
 Poul Reichhardt as Axel Poulsen, botanist
 Georg Richter as Meteorologist
 Toralf Sandø as A porter
 Harald Schwenzen as Halvorsen
 Claus Wiese as Stein, Finn's assistant

External links

1951 films
1950s Danish-language films
1951 drama films
Danish black-and-white films
Films directed by Johan Jacobsen
Danish drama films